WFVS-LP (104.3 FM) was a radio station licensed to Fort Valley, Georgia, United States. The station was owned by The Broadcasters Club of Fort Valley State University.

The university surrendered WFVS-LP's license to the Federal Communications Commission (FCC) on December 29, 2014; the FCC cancelled the license the same day.  It was forced to do so under FCC rules, since FVSU purchased the construction permit for what is now WFVS-FM on 96.9 from Calvary Chapel Heartlands Baptist Church.

References

External links
 

FVS-LP
FVS-LP
Fort Valley State University
Radio stations established in 2004
2004 establishments in Georgia (U.S. state)
Defunct radio stations in the United States
Radio stations disestablished in 2014
2014 disestablishments in Georgia (U.S. state)
FVS-LP
FVS-LP